is a 5,050-capacity multi-use stadium located in Kōtō, Tokyo on  in Tokyo Bay. The stadium is mostly used for football but also has an athletics track. The seating capacity is 2,350 seats, and the grass stand holds 2,700 people.

The stadium was the main home of Sagawa Express Tokyo SC before that club's merger with its Osaka-based sister club and subsequent relocation to Shiga. It currently serves as the home ground of FC Tokyo U-23 in addition to the Ajinomoto Field Nishigaoka. The stadium hosted the Learning Disabled football championships in 2002.

References

External links
 Official website
 Koto City – Facilities

Football venues in Japan
Sports venues in Tokyo
Buildings and structures in Koto, Tokyo